Andrew Phillips is a deaf lawyer, and an advocate for equal access.

Early life 
Andrew Phillips went to the California School for the Deaf (Fremont).

Career 
Phillips served as a Congressional Intern of U.S. Senator Barbara Boxer. 
After graduating Gallaudet Andrew did an internship with the Director of Policy / General Counsel at the National Council on Disability.

Career 
Andrew Phillips serves as policy counsel for the National Association of the Deaf (NAD).

References 

Living people
Deaf lawyers
Year of birth missing (living people)
Gallaudet University alumni
Place of birth missing (living people)
University of California, Hastings College of the Law alumni
California lawyers
American deaf people